Jill Latiano (born September 17, 1980) is an American actress, model, dancer, and television personality.

Career
Latiano began her career in 1999 as a dancer for the New York Knicks. From 2003 to 2005, she was the host of the NYC Media series Fashion in Focus. She made her acting debut in an episode of Sex and the City in 2004. She has guest starred in Rescue Me, CSI: NY, Ugly Betty, Drake & Josh, Moonlight, and Community. She appeared in the films Epic Movie (2007), Lower Learning (2008), Fired Up (2009), and the psychological thriller Kalamity (2010).

Personal life
Latiano married Glenn Howerton on September 8, 2009. She also guest starred in Howerton's series It's Always Sunny in Philadelphia, playing a love interest to his character in the episode "The D.E.N.N.I.S. System". Their first child, Miles Robert, was born on September 12, 2011. The couple had a second son in August 2014 whom they named Isley Ray. Her father Bob Latiano died in 2016 at the age of 71 and the eighth episode of the twelfth season of It's Always Sunny in Philadelphia was dedicated in his memory.

Filmography

Film

Television

References

External links

21st-century American actresses
Actresses from New York City
American female dancers
Dancers from New York (state)
Female models from New York (state)
American film actresses
American television actresses
Television personalities from New York City
American women television personalities
Living people
People from Manhattan
1981 births